Lal Thawng Thang  is a Burmese politician who currently serves as Minister of Chin Ethnic Affairs  for Sagaing Region and  Chin Parliamentary 
MP  for Chin .

Political career 
In the 2015 Myanmar general election, he was elected as a Sagaing Region Hluttaw MP, winning a majority of 33,987 votes from Chin  parliamentary constituency. He also serving as a Regional Minister of Chin Ethnic Affairs for Sagaing Region .

References

Members of legislatures of Burmese states and regions
Tai-Leng Nationalities Development Party politicians
Living people
People from Shan State
Year of birth missing (living people)